Dr. Hartwell Carver (1789 – April 16, 1875) was an American doctor, businessman, and an early promoter of what would become the Transcontinental Railroad.

Carver's push for a railroad to connect both coasts of the United States began in 1832 with a proposal that was dismissed by Congress. Over the next several years, Carver wrote a series of articles in the New York Courier and Enquirer about the subject. He participated in the hammering of the Golden Spike that officially joined the Central Pacific and Union Pacific railroads on May 10, 1869 at Promontory, Utah.

Hartwell Carver was the great-grandson of John Carver, who came over on the Mayflower and was the first governor of Plymouth Colony.

His historic home in Pittsford sold in 2018 for $1,179,000.

Carver was interred at Mount Hope Cemetery in Rochester, New York under a 50-foot (15.24 m)  monument erected by the Union Pacific Railroad. The monument is the second tallest in the cemetery. The inscription reads:

References

1789 births
1875 deaths
19th-century American physicians
People from Monroe County, New York
American people in rail transportation
American railway entrepreneurs
Burials at Mount Hope Cemetery (Rochester)
19th-century American businesspeople